Les Suprêmes (The Supreme Ones) is the junior-level synchronized skating team representing the figure skating club Club de Patinage Artistique de Saint-Léonard (CPA St-Léonard) in Montréal, Quebec, Canada. CPA St-Léonard fields teams, all named Les Suprêmes, at six levels: pre-juvenile, juvenile, novice, open, junior and senior.

Competitive results

Competitive results (2000–10)

Competitive results (2000–15)

References

External links
Official website of Les Suprêmes

Junior synchronized skating teams
Sports teams in Quebec
World Junior Synchronized Skating Championships medalists